Erringden is a civil parish in the metropolitan borough of Calderdale, West Yorkshire, England.   It contains 30 listed buildings that are recorded in the National Heritage List for England. All the listed buildings are designated at Grade II, the lowest of the three grades, which is applied to "buildings of national importance and special interest".  The parish is entirely rural and consists mainly of moorland with isolated buildings, and most of the listed buildings are houses, farmhouses, and farm buildings.  The Rochdale Canal runs through the northwest part of the parish, and the listed buildings associated with this are two bridges and two locks, and the parish also contains a former packhorse bridge.


Buildings

References

Citations

Sources

Lists of listed buildings in West Yorkshire